Ultimate Abyss is the fourth EP by Sphere Lazza, released on January 1, 2005, by AcidVictim Records.

Reception 
Brutal Resonance called Ultimate Abyss "very interesting" and that "Trousdale have occasionally a really great voice with a style you don't hear that often in the EBM-genre." Chain D.L.K. said "you get an even better sense of just how good Trousdale's vocals are for the material, and how good the material is when compared with a lot of drek you find out there these days." Funprox called the music "good for the dance-floors as well" and "with this single Sphere Lazza gives a new sign of life."

Track listing

Personnel 
Adapted from the Ultimate Abyss liner notes.

Sphere Lazza
 Tony Spaz – instruments, production
 David Trousdale – vocals, instruments, production

Release history

References

External links 
 Ultimate Abyss at Discogs (list of releases)
 Ultimate Abyss at iTunes

2005 EPs
Sphere Lazza albums